Roberto Ballesteros (born March 22, 1954) is a Peruvian actor. Although he was born in Lima, Peru, Ballesteros is widely known for his work in Mexican telenovela and films, leading many of his fans to believe that he is actually Mexican.

In the United States and Puerto Rico, Ballesteros is sometimes seen working on Univision.

Career
Ballesteros has played a variety of roles during his career, including romantic antagonists and leads. He is usually cast as a villain or as a drug dealer in Mexican action films, but has occasionally played heroes, cops and other roles as well.

Apart from several soap operas, including Rosa salvaje opposite Verónica Castro, Ballesteros has also been in films such as:

El Dia de Los Albaniles 3, 1987
Los Verduleros 2, 1987
El Dia de Los Albaniles 4, 1990
Keiko en Peligro, 1990
Alarido del Terror, 1991
Mujer de Cabaret, 1991
Retén, 1991
Persecución Infernal, 1992
El Trono del Infierno, 1994
Fuerza Maldita, 1995
Las Nueve Caras del Miedo, 1995
Secuestro, 1995
Venganza Mortal, 1995
El Destazador, 1996
El Regreso de la Bestia, 1998
La Lobo del Aňo, 1999
Los 6 Mandamientos de la Risa, 1999
El Seňor de Sinaloa, 2000
Sangre de Cholo, 2009
Los Siete, 2010

Ballesteros has also acted in mini-series such as Navidad sin Fin, María Isabel, Cañaveral de Pasiones, María Mercedes, Mujer, Casos de la Vida Real, Simplemente María, Quinceañera and others. He has shared acting credits with other Mexican television and film stars like Castro, Thalia Sodi, Mario Almada, Sebastian Ligalde, Eduardo Palomo, Victoria Ruffo,  and Alfonso Zayas.

Filmography
 Cabo (2022) . . . . Fausto
 Buscando a Frida (2021) .... Fabio Pedroza
 Por amar sin ley (2018-2019) .... Jaime
 Tres veces Ana (2016) .... Tadeo Nájera
 Lo imperdonable (2015) .... Joaquín Arroyo
 Hasta el fin del mundo (2014-2015) .... Félix Tavares
 Como dice el dicho (2014) .... Lisandro 
 Qué bonito amor (2012-2013).... Comandante Leonardo Derecho
 Por ella soy Eva (2012) .... Lic. Raúl Mendoza (Villano)
 Llena de amor (2010) .... Bernardo Izquierdo (Villano)
 Camaleones (2009-2010) .... Ricardo Calderón
 Palabra de mujer (2007-2008) .... Genaro Arreola
 Código Postal (2006-2007) .... Bruno Zubieta
 La esposa virgen (2005) .... Cristóbal (Villano)
 Contra viento y marea (2005) .... Arcadio
 Apuesta por un amor (2005) .... Justo Hernández (Villano)
 Amarte es mi pecado (2004) ... Marcelo Previni (Villano)
 Amar otra vez (2004) .... Julio Morales
 Niña amada mía (2003) .... Melchor Arrieta (Villano)
 Navidad sin fin (2001) .... Casimiro
 Sin pecado concebido (2001) .... Teniente Epigmenio Nava (Villano)
 Mujer bonita (2001) .... Servando
 El precio de tu amor (2000-2001) .... Rodolfo Galván (Villano)
 Por tu amor (1999) .... Sandro Valle
 Cuento de Navidad (1999) .... Gonzalo / Sr. Penumbra
 El diario de Daniela (1998-1999) .... Arturo Barto (Villano)
 Preciosa (1998) .... Sándor (Villano)
 Rencor apasionado (1998) .... Carmelo Camacho
 María Isabel (1997) .... Armando Noguera (Villano)
 Mi querida Isabel (1997) .... Federico
 Cañaveral de pasiones (1996) .... Rufino Mendoza (Villano)
 La antorcha encendida (1996) .... Vicente Guerrero
 Maria José (1995) .... Joel
 María la del Barrio (1995) .... Fantasma
 Bajo un mismo rostro(1995) .... César
 El vuelo del águila (1994-1995) .... Vicente Guerrero
 María Mercedes (1992-1993) .... Cordelio Cordero Mansó (Villano)
 La pícara soñadora (1991) .... Adolfo Molina
 Mi pequeña Soledad (1990) .... Mateo Villaseñor (Villano)
 Simplemente María (1989-1990) .... Arturo D'Angelle (Villano)
 Quinceañera (1987-1988) .... Antonio
 Rosa salvaje (1987-1988) .... Dr. Germán Laprida
 Pobre señorita Limantour (1983) .... Germán
 Pobre juventud (1987) .... Néstor de la Peña
 Vivir un poco (1985) .... Marcos Llanos del Toro
 Los años felices (1984) .... Angelo
 Amalia Batista (1983) .... Macario
 Cuando los hijos se van (1983) .... Julio Francisco "Kiko" Mendoza
 Sorceress (American film) (1982) .... Traigon villano
 Soledad (1980) .... Martín
 Verónica (1980) .... Lisandro
 Colorina (1980) .... Julián Saldívar
 Los ricos también lloran (1979) .... Camarero
 Viviana (1978) .... José Aparicio
 El Reventon (1977) .... Dancer

References

External links

1952 births
Living people
20th-century Peruvian male actors
Peruvian emigrants to Mexico
Peruvian male telenovela actors
Peruvian male film actors
Male actors from Lima